Michael Thomas Neeb (born August 1962) is an American businessman, the president and CEO of HCA Healthcare UK since 2007.

Early life
Michael Thomas Neeb was born in August 1962. He earned a bachelor's degree in accounting from Baylor University in 1984 and a master's degree in business administration from the University of Dallas in 1998.

Career
Neeb joined HCA in 1991, moved to the UK in 2000 as CFO for its international division, and became president and CEO in 2007.

In 1999, Neeb was acquitted of charges of "defrauding federal health care programs through the submission of bogus expense claims", but two of his colleagues, Jay Jarrell and Robert Whiteside, were found guilty.

The case against Jay Jarrell and Robert Whiteside thrown out on appeal as the accounting treatment in question was not considered unreasonable.

The case in question was about the government trying to criminalize accounting entries made in the late 1970s and early 1980s on one hospital's Medicare cost report, prepared by Cost Report experts (think tax return prepared by tax accountants).  The issue was whether $200k of interest expense was related to capital vs working capital.  Neeb was CFO of the hospital from 1992 to 1994 and signed the Medicare Cost report.  The appeal court dismissed the entire case indicating the accounting treatment made on the cost report was in fact, reasonable.

Personal life
Neeb is married to Amy, and they have two children.

References

1962 births
Living people
American chief executives
Baylor University alumni
University of Dallas alumni
HCA Healthcare people